Samuel Smith Old Brewery, popularly known as Samuel Smith's or Sam Smith's, is an independent brewery and pub owner based in Tadcaster, North Yorkshire, England. It is Yorkshire's oldest brewery, founded in 1758, and one of three breweries in the town. Samuel Smith's, which is an unlimited family-owned company, produces a range including bitters, stouts, porters, lagers, and fruit beers, and is known as a highly traditional and somewhat eccentric operator of around 200 pubs due to its continued use of dray horses, bans on music and mobile devices, and low beer prices.

History
Tadcaster, North Yorkshire, has produced beer since the 14th century owing to the quality and accessibility of the local water supply, which is rich in lime sulphate after being pumped up from an underground lake of limestone water; it became second only to Burton upon Trent, Staffordshire as an English brewing centre. Two of Tadcaster's three surviving breweries were founded by members of the Smith family.

The Old Brewery was established as the Backhouse & Hartley Brewery in 1758. In 1847, John Smith purchased the small brewery with funding provided by his father, a successful butcher and cattle dealer from Meanwood, Leeds, but soon built his own new brewery John Smith's, close by. John Smith's brother William, who ran the business after John's death in 1879, left the Old Brewery to his young nephew Samuel in 1886. However, Samuel inherited an empty building and its well, with all equipment having been moved to the New Brewery. Nevertheless, he was enabled by the buoyant beer industry to open Samuel Smith's Brewery under his own name and was able to compete with the established John Smith's Brewery.

Samuel Smith beers in bottled form were a major influence on American craft brewers such as Goose Island and Brooklyn Brewery in the late 1970s and early 1980s, helped popularise classic British beer styles.

The Old Brewery

The Old Brewery is both the oldest brewery in Yorkshire and the only surviving independent brewery in Tadcaster. The smallest of the three modern-day Tadcaster breweries, Samuel Smith's is one of the few remaining British breweries to employ the traditional Yorkshire Square system, a method of fermentation developed in the 19th century to cleanse beer of yeast. Most modern squares are made of stainless steel but Smith’s prefers Welsh slate, which they feel helps keep natural carbonation entrained in the beer, imparting a creamier texture.

Brewing water for ales and stouts is still drawn from the original  well, sunk when the site was established in 1758, and the yeast used in the fermentation process is of a strain that has been used continuously since approximately 1900—one of the oldest unchanged strains in the country. In keeping with this sense of history and tradition, the brewery keeps a small team of dapple-grey shire horses. Rather than being show horses, they are among the last active dray horses in the world; they deliver beer around the town of Tadcaster five days a week. The brewery site has expanded over the years and is divided by Centre Lane. New Street separates it from the adjacent John Smith's Brewery.

Beers

Since discontinuing Museum Ale in the early 1990s, Samuel Smith's has brewed only one cask beer, Old Brewery Bitter (OBB). This is unusual in the British brewing industry, as most brewers will either produce a range of real ales or none at all.

The brewery also produces a range of brewery-conditioned beers. All its beers, with the exception of the Old Brewery Bitter and Yorkshire Stingo, are vegan.

In the United States, Samuel Smith's bottled beers are imported by Merchant du Vin. In Norway, the beers are imported by Strag AS. The beers are also sold in certain places in Northern Ireland. Samuel Smith's Organic Cider is available in bottles, while Cider Reserve is sold on draught solely in the UK. The brewery offers two draught milds, Dark Mild and Light Mild. Most pubs will offer only one variant. The brewery used to produce a super strength Barley Wine called Strong Golden at 10.2%. A range of bottled fruit beers are available, flavoured with cherry, apricot or raspberry.

In recent years, the brewery have altered their product line-up, dispensing with Tadcaster Bitter but introducing Best Bitter. Best Bitter and Sovereign are the brewery's only keg bitters. They introduced Double Four in late 2013, a 4% strength lager aimed at providing a standard strength lager to bridge the gap between Alpine (2.8%) and Taddy Lager (4.5%). A wheat beer has been added to the draught product range, although few pubs stock it. Until 2006 Samuel Smith's used the brand name Ayingerbräu for its lagers and wheat beers, using the name and logo of German brewery, Brauerei Aying. The brand was best known for its 'man-in-a-box' pump for Ayingerbräu Lager, which featured a model Bavarian man inside a plastic box.

Pubs
Samuel Smith's operates over 200 pubs - including rural, suburban, inner-city and city-centre ones, with over 20 pubs in central London - which are notable for their independence: the beers are all produced by the Tadcaster brewery and no large corporation spirits or soft drinks are available. Irrespective of the location, the pubs are maintained in a traditional manner. Most incorporate multiple bars and rooms, often with a spartan public bar and a more plush lounge. Samuel Smith's still delivers multiple-trip reusable bottles in beer crates. 

In 2000, the "publicity-shy" company began removing the branding from its pubs and delivery vehicles, making it difficult to determine the exact number it operates. Samuel Smith's public houses are distinctive in their plain appearance with limited signage or artwork. In November 2004, the company took the decision to ban music and televisions in its pubs, saving it from paying Performing Rights levy.

Though wet-led, food has been offered since 2007. The brewery's pubs now have centrally determined set menus from which individual pubs can select to create its menu. All portion sizes and serving practice are set by the brewery. Further to the company phasing out brands, all pubs now sell Samuel Smith's branded crisps, peanuts, pork scratchings and cheese biscuits.

In 2019, the brewery became further notorious for its prohibitions after introducing rules banning the use of mobile telephones, tablets, e-books and laptops within the indoor area of its pubs with the aim of removing activities that discouraged conversation. The ban also includes "pictures of sport".

Design of pubs

Most of the Samuel Smith's pubs are traditional in their layout and decoration. Many have multiple rooms, most have a lounge and a tap room. Most Samuel Smith's pubs have traditional frosted windows for privacy; many decorated with stained glass. The interiors are often characterised with having either brown or beige walls or elaborate wall paper. Some have notable furniture such as the Crown Inn in Wetherby which has furniture by Robert Thompson or the Princess Louise in High Holborn with its unique booths around the bar.

Controversies

The GMB trade union has criticised the company for its treatment and sudden dismissal of pub managers, resulting in numerous employment tribunals.

The brewery, under the direction of Humphrey Smith, is a major landowner within Tadcaster and a holder of many properties across England. Accusations of neglect to long-term empty properties were aired during a 2009 edition of BBC Inside Out Yorkshire & Lincolnshire. It also explored Smith's local power and disputes with Selby District Council, the local authority for Tadcaster, such as his pursuit of a number of planning application objections to judicial review stage at the council's cost.

2010
In October 2010, it was reported that the brewery was taking legal action against Cropton Brewery over the use of the Yorkshire white rose design. Cropton Brewery released a beer named Yorkshire Warrior, celebrating the Yorkshire Regiment. The proceeds of the beer's sales go directly to the regimental benevolent fund for wounded soldiers. In a decision from the court, Cropton was ordered to remove the white rose emblem from their Yorkshire Warrior brand, but the judge criticised both breweries for taking the case so far through the legal system and not settling the issue sooner.

2011
On New Year's Eve 2011, Humphrey Smith closed the Junction Inn in Royton because the landlords were dispensing too much beer in their pints and subsequently issued a retrospective surcharge of £10,733 for lost stock over a 12-year period.

In April 2011, a gay couple were ejected for kissing, from the John Snow pub, owned by Samuel Smith's in London's "gay village" Soho. The pub was then targeted by hundreds of protestors in a "kiss-in".

2016
In January 2016, Samuel Smith's Old Brewery opposed the construction on its land of a temporary bridge over the River Wharfe, which would allow residents to cross the town, which was divided following the collapse of the 300-year-old bridge, claiming that, at a cost of £300,000, it was "a waste of public money".

2017
In July 2017, Samuel Smith's Brewery banned motorcyclists from one of their pubs. Initially, no explanation was offered for the ban. It was later reported that the ban was instituted to keep "undesirables" from patronising the establishment. Local, long-term customers who were refused entry because they owned motorcycles, were offended by the notion of being compared to criminal motorcycle gangs. The affected customers reportedly have no legal recourse as "bikers were not a 'protected group' under the Equality Act."

In October 2017, the brewery issued a chain-wide ban on the use of profanity in its pubs. The "zero-tolerance" policy calls for employees to cut off service to customers who use offensive language. It was reported that this policy, along with recent bans of groups identified as "undesirable" or potentially "rowdy" due to certain types of clothing worn, is part of a "traditional, "uncompromisingly Victorian" aesthetic" that the brewery tries to maintain in its pubs, which includes an absence of music and televisions.

2018
In 2018, both the brewery and Humphrey Smith were prosecuted and fined for failing to provide information regarding staff pension funds. Smith was accused of being "deliberately inflammatory" in his response to a request in 2015 from The Pensions Regulator, calling their request for evidence of the brewery's fiscal responsibility to its staff pension fund "tiresome".

2020
The brewery was criticised by councillors in Wakefield during the COVID-19 pandemic for explicitly ordering pub staff not to implement a coronavirus test and trace system in its pubs.

In August 2020, after the Cow and Calf in Sheffield failed to serve his favourite dessert, Humphrey Smith dismissed the pub's managers and shuttered the place.

2021
In 2021, following the Abbey pub in Darley Abbey being left empty for over 2 years, the 15th century, Grade II listed building was falling into disrepair. After repeated attempts at engagement with Sam Smith, local residents and politicians petitioned Sam Smith to protect the local landmark from further deterioration.

See also
 British regional breweries using wooden casks

References

 Oliver, Garrett. 'The Brewmaster's Table: Discovering the Pleasures of Real Beer with Real Food.' New York: HarperCollins, 2005. . Retrieved 10 December 2011.

External links

Official website

1758 establishments in England
Breweries in Yorkshire
Companies based in Selby
Food and drink companies established in 1758
Tadcaster
British companies established in 1758